Nikolay Alexandrovich Abramov (5 January 1984 – 30 December 2010) was a Russian professional football player.

Club career
He made his Russian Football National League debut for FC Baltika Kaliningrad on 28 March 2004 in a game against FC Lokomotiv Chita.

References

External links

1984 births
2010 deaths
People from Kasimov
Sportspeople from Ryazan Oblast
Russian footballers
Russia under-21 international footballers
Association football defenders
FC Baltika Kaliningrad players
FC Spartak Moscow players
FC Sheksna Cherepovets players
FC Spartak-MZhK Ryazan players